Kisa or KISA may refer to:

People
 Janet Kisa (born 1992), Kenyan runner
 Kisa Gotami, disciple of Buddha
 Rostislav Kiša (born 1978), Czech footballer

Places
 Khisa, also known as Kisa, a village in Botswana
 Kisa, Hiroshima, a former town in Hiroshima Prefecture, Japan, now merged with Miyoshi
 Kisa Station, a train station in Miyoshi
 Kisa, Iran, a village in Hormozgan Province, Iran
 Kisa, Sweden, a town in Östergötland County, Sweden

Organizations
 Kisa BK, a Swedish football club
 KISA-LD, a low-power television station (channel 22, virtual 40) licensed to serve San Antonio, Texas, United States
 KISA (NGO), the Movement for Equality, Support, Anti-Racism (Greek: Κίνηση για Ισότητα, Στήριξη, Αντιρατσισμό, abbreviated to ΚΙΣΑ), a Cypriot non-governmental organization established in 1998
 KISA Phone, an Australian telecommunications services provider founded in 2013
 The Korea Internet & Security Agency

Other uses
 Kisa Sohma, a character in the manga and anime Fruits Basket
 "Kisa the Cat", an Icelandic fairy tale
 Kisa tribe (Luhya), an indigenous tribe of Kenya